Ballysteena  is a small townland in the barony of Ormond Lower in County Tipperary, Ireland.

References

Townlands of County Tipperary